Sarasota–Bradenton International Airport  is located within three jurisdictions: Sarasota County, the city limits of Sarasota, and Manatee County, in the U.S. state of Florida.

History

Origins 
Before the Sarasota-Bradenton Airport was built, both Sarasota and Bradenton had their own airfields: Bradenton's Bradenton Airport and Sarasota's Lowe Field. Bradenton Airport was established somewhere between 1935 and 1937 being abandoned at an unknown point during World War 2. Lowe Field would be dedicated on January 12, 1929 and would end up opening on March 12. National Airlines would begin flying out of the airfield on August 4, 1937. Flights were often canceled because the landing strip got too wet to land on which led to National Airlines leaving later that year after Sarasota could not pay for building concrete runways. During World War II, Lowe Field was used by the Civil Air Patrol. After the war, most civilian operations at Lowe Field went to the Sarasota-Bradenton Airport with the exception of student pilots, mosquito control programs, and crop dusters. The airport continued operating until 1961 when the owner sold the land.

The airport was considered a replacement for Lowe Field's poor conditions and low capacity. Construction on the Sarasota-Bradenton Airport started in 1939 and opened the following year with CCC and WPA assistance at a cost of $1 million. In May 1941, the Sarasota Manatee Airport Authority was created.

Name origins 
In the 1940s, SRQ was known by its two-character designation, RS. By 1948, growth in aviation demand prompted IATA to coordinate the assignment of three-character codes. The airport initially received the designation "SSO", a short-lived code subject to misinterpretation as the international distress signal, SOS. SRQ was chosen, with "Q" serving as filler text. The airport's IATA airport code, "SRQ", is used as a general nickname for the city of Sarasota and Sarasota area, as exemplified by media outlets like SRQ Magazine, WSRQ radio, and numerous local businesses in the area that include SRQ in their names.

World War II 
In 1942, with the United States entering World War 2, the airport was leased to the Army Air Corps and became known as the Sarasota Army Airfield. The Army Air Corps later added 250 acres making the airport 870 acres. The 97th Bombardment Group was the first group, being transferred from MacDill Air Force Base in Tampa for training with B-17 Flying Fortresses staying from March to May. The 97th as well did construction and maintenance, including the construction of barracks and runway repair.

After the 97th left, the 92nd Operations Group arrived for training and did construction work also. In June the base was designated as a sub base changing its focus from bombers to fighters because the runways could not withstand the bomber's weight. The 69th Fighter Squadron transferred to the airfield from Drew Army Airfield to train with P-39 Airacobras. Sarasota had sub bases in: Bartow, St. Petersburg, Fort Myers, and Tampa, while Immokalee, Lake Wales, Punta Gorda and Winter Haven served as auxiliary fields for the base. Training was conducted as well on the base, with 70 pilots graduating on average every 30 days.

On July 25, 1945, a Douglas TC-47B that left out of Sarasota to Lake Charles on a navigation training session crashed after going through a thunderstorm north of Tampa. All 13 crew members died onboard. The aircraft crashed roughly 20 miles northeast of Tampa.

After 3 years of use, the base officially closed and was transferred to civilian usage in 1947. Despite its transfer, the airport and its facilities deteriorated until the Florida Legislature passed the 1955 Sarasota Manatee Airport Authority Act. This act gave the airport more legal power and guidelines to operate.

Post–World War II expansion 

National Airlines was SRQ's first airline, moving from Lowe's Field by 1947. Cancer research institute; Jackson Memorial Laboratories considered establishing a laboratory on airport property. The extent of the plan is not known.

By April 1957, OAG showed six NA departures a day. Construction started on a terminal building designed by Paul Rudolph and locally known architect, John Cromwell on August 18, 1958 and opening on May 2 the next year. with: a control tower, ticketing area, offices, gift shop, coffee shop, and a balcony for passengers to watch their planes arrive. In its opening year of 1959, the airport had roughly 22,000 annual passengers. Eastern arrived in January 1961, along with an air mail service as well. The airport's first jet flights were Eastern 727s in winter 1964–65 (though the longest runway was 5006 ft for a few years after that). By the 1960s the airport along with Eastern and National Airlines, welcomed two commuter airlines: Executive in 1964 and Florida Air in 1968. Executive established Sarasota as a maintenance base and later their headquarters from 1968 to 1971 and flew flights to Tampa and Fort Myers.

1970s 
By 1970, the airport had five commercial airlines: Eastern, National, Executive, Florida, and for a brief period, Mackey. Despite its continued growth through the 1970s, many airlines services were intermittent. Mackey and Florida both left in early 1970. Florida returned four years later and simultaneously established Sarasota as its headquarters. When Executive Airlines went bankrupt in 1971, it was replaced by Shawnee Airlines for a year and later returned in 1977. On March 30, 1974, an armed man would attempt to hijack a Boeing 727 from National Airlines. He would bring two hostages with him and demand that he be flown out of the area. He would be unsuccessful as a maintenance worker onboard disarmed him. He ended up being captured about 4 hours afterwards receiving two concurrent sentences with one lasting for 15 years and another for 25. A commuter airline named Sun Airlines had flights to several destinations from mid-1974 to mid-1975. The latter part of the decade introduced North Central Airlines in 1978, and Delta the following year.

The Airport Authority would also change during the 1970s as well. In 1970, voters in Manatee and Sarasota counties decided that the authority should be elected instead of appointed, and state legislation was passed affirming this in 1972.

1976 presidential election 
During the 1976 presidential election, several candidates would visit and/or fly into the airport. On February 23, 1976, Gerald R. Ford and his family flew into the airport on Air Force One while visiting Sarasota on a trip across Florida. He briefly took questions from the press before leaving to go to a hotel. The following day he went to a church service and a barbecue. He gave a brief press conference before flying out of the airport to Tampa. Next month, on March 2, Jimmy Carter would hold a press conference at the airport before speaking to the public at adjacent New College. Likely that same day, Henry "Scoop" Jackson another presidential candidate running on the Democratic ticket, would host a campaign rally at the airport. George Wallace, also visited the airport two days later on March 4.

1980s & 1990s 
In the late 1970s and early 1980s, there was a controversial proposal to move the airport by both Sarasota County and Manatee County due to airport overcrowding. An opinion poll was held in 1970 with 66% of voters voting against a new airport. The proposal suggested making the facility into a general aviation airport and constructing a replacement east of future Interstate 75 within Lakewood Ranch. Opposition to the airport would also come from a local environmentalist, Gloria Rains, who was the head and founder of ManaSota-88, an environmental group. Rains would later on be opposed to the development of Lakewood Ranch as well but did like that natural features in the area were preserved. However, the airport authority struck down the idea in 1985. A facility for commuter flights would be added onto the airport in 1983. Instead of building a new airport, the airport's facilities, in general, would be expanded. Work began in 1987 to build a new airport terminal along with areas for parking, ramp space and landscaping. The new terminal building would open on October 29, 1989. During the first day the new airport terminal was in operation, the Sarasota Herald-Tribune reported that passengers and airline staff liked it. On its first day of operations the airport would still be under construction and several problems were encountered: the computer system on the upstairs level security checkpoint area would have glitches along with problems being reported with the terminal's air conditioning. The rest of the project would be finished by 1990.

The airport was designated port of entry status in 1992.

September 11 attacks
Air Force One was at the airport on September 11, 2001. George W. Bush was at the Emma E. Booker Elementary School in Sarasota when Andrew Card first informed him of the September 11, 2001 attacks, at 9:05 AM.  Bush returned to the airport. The 747 taxied out at 9:54 AM and took off from runway 14 at 9:55 AM flying first to Barksdale Air Force Base in Louisiana.

2003 – present

In 2003, AirTran Airways began service at SRQ to Hartsfield–Jackson Atlanta International Airport, and Baltimore–Washington International Airport, and by 2011 the airline served six U.S. cities nonstop from SRQ.

In January 2012, AirTran Airways announced that it would drop SRQ on August 12, 2012, as part of its merger with Southwest Airlines.  Despite this, Southwest Airlines began service to SRQ in February 2021.

2020s and late 2010s 
Construction on a new aircraft control tower would start in November 2015 and was finished in 2017. Starting in the late 2010s the airport would start to rapidly grow in passenger traffic in a move mostly credited to Allegiant beginning to service the airport. Prior to the beginning of the COVID-19 pandemic the airport would be one of the fastest growing in the United States. 

On December 19, 2019, a GMC pickup truck crashed into the baggage claim causing $250,000 in damage.

The COVID-19 pandemic resulted in air traffic significantly declining similar to other airports in the United States but would be the least impacted airports nationally. Despite a decline in the number of passengers several new flights were added/announced. Elite Airways would expand operations at the airport in 2021 when they started nonstop flights to White Plains, Martha's Vineyard, Nantucket and Portland, Maine on July 2. Passenger numbers in 2021 would end up being 70% higher than before the pandemic and would end up breaking a one-year passenger traffic record set in 1990 in a span of 8 months.

To accommodate for recent growth, a new terminal named Concourse A (while the current/original terminal will be called Concourse B) will be built possibly by 2024 and will contain five gates. The new terminal will increase passenger capacity by 2.5 million.

Facilities
It has two asphalt runways: 14/32 is 9,500 by 150 feet (2,896 x 46 m) and 04/22 is 5,009 by 150 feet (1,527 x 46 m).

In the year ending November 30, 2017, the airport had 101,311 aircraft operations, an average of 278 per day: 80% general aviation, 11% airline, 8% air taxi, and 2% military. 272 aircraft were then based at this airport: 69% single-engine, 18% jet, 7% multi-engine, 6% helicopter, and <1% ultra-light.

The National Plan of Integrated Airport Systems (NPIAS) for 2023–2027 categorized it a "small hub" airport since it enplanes 0.05 percent to 0.25 percent of total U.S. passenger enplanements.

Terminals
The airport contains two terminals with a total of 13 gates. Both Terminal B & Terminal D opened on October 29, 1989.

Terminal B is the main terminal at the airport and contains 13 gates.

Airlines and destinations

Passenger

Destinations map

Statistics

Airline market share

Top domestic destinations

References

External links

 Sarasota Bradenton International Airport, official site
 
 History of Airline Service at Sarasota 1930s-1960s
 Sarasota Bradenton Airport in the 1970s, An extensive history of airline service
 
 

Airports in Florida
Airports in the Tampa Bay area
Transportation buildings and structures in Manatee County, Florida
Transportation buildings and structures in Sarasota County, Florida
Airports established in 1939
1939 establishments in Florida
Formerly Used Defense Sites in Florida
Airfields of the United States Army Air Forces in Florida